Alexey Okulov is a Soviet and Russian physicist, the author of pioneering works in laser physics 
and theoretical physics.

Biography 
Joined Lebedev Physical Institute Moscow in October 1979. Graduated from 
Moscow Institute of Physics and Technology in 1980,  PhD from Lebedev Physical Institute, thesis "Periodicity and Chaos in Structured Light" in 1994.

Research 
A.Yu. Okulov made substantial contributions in the optical phase conjugation, angular momentum of light, ultracold atoms theory and chaos theory. In 1979-1980 he made the seminal experiments on coherent summation of laser beams via Optical phase conjugation in stimulated Brillouin scattering.
The Michelson interferometer had been used to demonstrate the
universal method for robust coherent summation of  laser beams with complex amplitude and phase profile. The nontrivial feature of the Michelson interferometer with stimulated Brillouin scattering mirror is that the interference pattern is insensitive to wavelength-scale phase distortions. This gives the unique opportunity to use a binary tree of  beamsplitters for coherent addition of   laser amplifiers.

This work demonstrated that linewidth of the stimulated Brillouin scattering phase conjugate mirror is due to stepwise phase fluctuations rather than phase diffusion responsible for conventional Schawlow-Townes Laser linewidth. 

In 2014 Dr. Okulov had shown that such binary-tree Michelson phase-conjugator with degenerate four-wave mixing Kerr nonlinear mirror could be used for coherent summation of chirped-pulse fiber laser amplifiers. 

In a field of Structured light Dr.Okulov proved theoretically that angular momentum of light is reversed in exactly opposite direction in optical phase conjugation mirror. He had shown that due to conservation of angular momentum, the optical phase conjugation mirror experiences the optical torque in addition to Radiation pressure. For these symmetry reasons, the acoustical vortices are excited inside a stimulated Brillouin scattering phase-conjugating mirror. He suggested a robust Sagnac-like interferometer for the perfect optical phase conjugation of vortex photons. 

A.Yu.Okulov built an exact theory for the quantum condensed matter trapped by optical vortices in Gross–Pitaevskii equation mean field approach. He found exact solutions describing superfluid motion in twisted optical potential mounted in slowly rotating reference frame

In a field of nonlinear dynamics of lasers Alexey Okulov introduced robust and computationally efficient method of infinite dimensional maps. The nonlinear spatiotemporal effects in laser pulse propagation as spatial solitons, Talbot effect and vortex lattices are computed via fast Fourier transform (FFT) and iterates of 
nonlinear integral mappings known from Chaos theory. 

 Member of the Optical Society since 1995
 Member of the APS since 1995
 Member of the SPIE since 1997
 Member of the DPG since 2021

See also
Gross–Pitaevskii equation
Optical vortex
Angular momentum 
Radiation pressure 
Orbital angular momentum of light
Chaos theory
Chirped pulse amplification
Soliton (optics)
Self-focusing
Michelson interferometer
Nonlinear optics
Talbot cavity
Coherent addition
Disk laser

References 

1956 births
Living people
Moscow Institute of Physics and Technology alumni
Academic staff of the Moscow Institute of Physics and Technology
Quantum optics